Harvey Konigsberg (born 1940) is an artist and aikido teacher. He is a 7th dan Shihan, making him one of the most senior aikido practitioners within the Aikikai.

Harvey Konigsberg was born in New York City in 1940. He studied Art at New York University and at the University of Miami. After completing his university studies in 1964, Konigsberg returned to New York City to begin a long and successful career as an artist.

Art 

During the mid to late 1960s, while Konigsberg was working on his famous Whale series of paintings, and on his less well known Jazz series, he, and his part-Blackfoot fashion-designer wife (Patti Konigsberg), were central figures in a dynamic group of aspiring young New York artist community, and he and Patti held a vibrant 'salon' gathering that many artists and musicians, writers and fashion designers regularly attended.

In the late 1960s the Konigsbergs moved briefly to Montreal, where they quickly rose to social prominence through friendships with English Canadians including Leonard Cohen and Irving Leighton. Shortly after Konigsberg's brilliant first Canadian show in 1970 (Gallerie D'Youville, Montreal), the Konigsbergs again returned to New York.

Through the 1970s, Konigsberg's art career flourished, with frequent one-man shows at galleries such as Starkman (NYC), Dallas (Texas) and Runyon-Winchell (NYC). Konigsberg fine art is inspired by a variety of subjects,with many focusing on the visual dynamics of both aikido and music performance.

Aikido 

In parallel with his painting career, Mr. Konigsberg began studying aikido in 1965, shortly after his arrival back in New York City at the finish of his University studies. In 1972 Konigsberg began training in iaido.

In the mid 1980s Konigsberg established a studio in Woodstock, New York. Since then he has maintained a presence in Woodstock as an artist and as an aikido instructor.

One of the original students of Yoshimitsu Yamada, Konigsberg has now been practicing aikido for over 50 years. He is the Chief Instructor at Woodstock Aikido, a beautiful unique dojo located in one of the historic buildings in the Woodstock Byrdcliffe community. He currently holds the 7th dan rank in Aikikai Aikido, with the title of Shihan (master instructor), is the senior member of the Aikido Technical Committee, and also has a dan ranking in iaido. A large number of his longtime students have now attained the high ranks of 4th, 5th and 6th dan Shidoin in aikido.

In addition to his instructing practice in Woodstock, Konigsberg also instructs at the New York Aikikai in Manhattan and teaches seminars across the U.S. and abroad.

Corporate collections 

Chromacomp Collection
Freehold Racecourse
Gulf Oil Collection
Hasegawa Enterprise Co., Ltd.
Mitsukoshi Collection
Pimlico Collection, Pimlico Racecourse
Dean Witter Reynolds
Sperry Rand Collection

Museum collections 

Joe and Emily Lowe Museum of Fine Arts; Coral Gables, Florida
Madison Square Garden Museum of Sports

Solo exhibitions 

1963 - Rogues Gallery; Miami, Florida
1965 - Cinema I Gallery; Springfield, Massachusetts
1966 - Mark of the Phoenix Gallery; NYC
1967 - James David Gallery; Miami, Florida
1968 - Hudson Guild Gallery; NYC
1969 - Gloria Luria Gallery; Miami, Florida
1970 - Gallerie D'Youville; Montreal, Quebec, Canada
1970 - Starkman Gallery, NYC
1972 - Dallas Gallery, Dallas, Texas
1975 - Runyon-Winchell Gallery; NYC
1976 - Runyon-Winchell Gallery; NYC
1977 - Runyon-Winchell Gallery; NYC
1979 - Runyon-Winchell Gallery; NYC
1980 - Brewster Gallery; NYC
1981 - Brewster Gallery; NYC
1983 - Brewster Gallery; NYC
1983 - Preakness Week Exhibition; Pimlico, Maryland
1984 - Preakness Week Exhibition; Pimlico, Maryland
1985 - Brewster Gallery; NYC
1988 - Bell Gallery; Woodstock, New York

References

External links
The Artist's Website
Woodstock Aikido
Aikidoonline gallery
Interview with Harvey Konigsberg 
Woodstock Aikido
About the Chief Instructor at Woodstock Aikido

American aikidoka
20th-century American painters
American male painters
21st-century American painters
21st-century American male artists
1940 births
Living people
Painters from New York City
New York University alumni
University of Miami alumni
20th-century American male artists